Ferencvárosi TC is a Hungarian professional football club based in Ferencváros, Budapest.

Managerial history
  István Tóth-Potya (1926–30)
  Zoltán Blum (1930–37)
  Sándor Bródy (1937)
  József Sándor (1937)
  Emil Rauchmaul (1937–38)
  György Hlavay (1938–39)
  Lajos Dimény (1939–42)
  István Tóth-Potya (1943)
  Alfréd Schaffer (1 July 1943 – 30 June 1944)
  Pál Szabó (1945)
  István Mike (1940s)
  Gábor Urbancsik (1945–46)
  Lajos Dimény (1946–47)
  Zoltán Opata (1947)
  Antal Lyka (1948–50)
  Miklós Vadas (1950)
  Gábor Urbancsik (1951)
  Ferenc Deák (1952)
  Károly Sós (1953–56)
  Árpád Csanádi (1957)
  Sándor Tátrai (1958–61)
  József Mészáros (1 July 1961 – 31 December 1965)
  Oszkár Vilezsál (1965)
  Sándor Tátrai (1966)
  Károly Lakat (1 January 1967 – 31 December 1969)
   Géza Kalocsay (1 January 1970 – 31 December 1970)
  Jenő Dalnoki (1970)
  Ferenc Csanádi (1970–73)
  Dezső Novák (1 January 1973 – 30 June 1973)
  Jenő Dalnoki (1973–78)
  Zoltán Friedmanszky (1978–80)
  Dezső Novák (1 July 1980 – 31 December 1983)
  Géza Vincze (1984–85)
  Jenő Dalnoki (1985–87)
  Gyula Rákosi (1987–90)
  Tibor Nyilasi (1990–94)
  Dezső Novák (1 July 1994 – 30 June 1996)
  József Mucha (interim) (1996)
  Zoltán Varga (1996–97)
  Tibor Nyilasi (1997–98)
  Marijan Vlak (1999)
  József Mucha (interim) (1999)
  Stanko Poklepović (1999-00)
  János Csank (1 January 2000 – 30 June 2002)
  József Garami (1 July 2002 – 30 June 2003)
  Attila Pintér (23 December 2003 – 30 June 2004)
   Csaba László (1 July 2004 – 10 November 2005)
  Imre Gellei (10 November 2005 – 15 April 2007)
  Zoran Kuntić (16 April 2007 – 4 July 2007)
  János Csank (4 July 2007 – 17 April 2008)
  Bobby Davison (17 April 2008 – 30 October 2009)
  Craig Short (29 October 2009 – 25 May 2010)
  László Prukner (1 July 2010 – 16 August 2011)
  Tamás Nagy (interim) (16 August 2011–30 August 2011)
  Lajos Détári (30 August 2011 – 20 August 2012)
  Ricardo Moniz (21 August 2012 – December 2013)
  Thomas Doll (18 December 2013 – 21 August 2018)
  Serhii Rebrov (22 August 2018 –4 June 2021)
  Peter Stöger (5 June 2021- 13 December 2021)
  Stanislav Cherchesov (20 December 2021-present)

References

 
Ferencvarosi